Hartmut Sommer (born 16 September 1934) is a German former sports shooter. He competed in three events at the 1968 Summer Olympics for East Germany.

References

External links
 

1934 births
Living people
German male sport shooters
Olympic shooters of East Germany
Shooters at the 1968 Summer Olympics
People from Stendal
Sportspeople from Saxony-Anhalt